These are the official results of the Women's 100 metres event at the 1991 IAAF World Championships in Tokyo, Japan. There were a total number of 59 participating athletes, with eight qualifying heats and the final held on August 27, 1991.

Medalists

Schedule
All times are Japan Standard Time (UTC+9)

Final

Semifinals
Held on August 27, 1991.

Quarterfinals
Held on August 26, 1991.

Qualifying heats
Held on August 26, 1991.

See also
 1988 Women's Olympic 100 metres (Seoul)
 1990 Women's European Championships 100 metres (Split)
 1992 Women's Olympic 100 metres (Barcelona)
 1993 Women's World Championships 100 metres (Stuttgart)

References
 Results
 Results-World Athletics 

 
100 metres at the World Athletics Championships
1991 in women's athletics